Antanimena is a town and commune in Madagascar. It belongs to the district of Toliara II, which is a part of Atsimo-Andrefana Region. The population of the commune was estimated to be approximately 4,000 in 2001 commune census.

Primary and junior level secondary education are available in town. The majority 50% of the population of the commune are farmers, while an additional 42% receives their livelihood from raising livestock. The most important crops are sweet potatoes and cowpeas, while other important agricultural products are other peas and maize.  Services provide employment for 6% of the population. Additionally fishing employs 2% of the population.

Rivers
The commune is crossed by the Onilahy River.

References and notes 

Populated places in Atsimo-Andrefana